DA2 may refer to:

 (15836) 1995 DA2, a trans-Neptunian object
 3/15 DA-2, a BMW car model
 DA postcode area (Dartford postcode area), a group of postal codes in England
 Davis DA-2, a light aircraft
 Dethalbum II, an album by Dethklok
 Dragon Age II, a 2011 video game by Bioware